Jimi Hendrix (1942–1970) was an American guitarist and singer-songwriter whose career spanned from 1962 to 1970. His discography includes the recordings released during his lifetime.  Prior to his rise to fame, he recorded 24 singles as a backing guitarist with American R&B artists, such as the Isley Brothers and Little Richard.  Beginning in late 1966, he recorded three best-selling studio albums and 13 singles with the Jimi Hendrix Experience. An Experience compilation album and half of a live album recorded at the Monterey Pop Festival were also issued prior to his death.  After the breakup of the Experience in mid-1969, songs from his live performances were included on the Woodstock: Music from the Original Soundtrack and More and Band of Gypsys albums.  A studio single with the Band of Gypsys was also released.

Hendrix's albums and singles with the Experience were originally released by Track Records in the United Kingdom and Reprise Records in the United States.  Track also issued the Band of Gypsys' album, but to settle an American contract dispute, it was released by Capitol Records in the US. The Woodstock soundtrack album was issued by Atlantic Records and its subsidiary Cotillion Records in US.  Over the years, the Hendrix catalogue has been handled by different record companies, including Track's successor, Polydor Records in Europe and the UK, and MCA Records. In 2010, Sony's Legacy Recordings became the exclusive distributor for the recordings managed by Experience Hendrix, a family company.  His original albums have been reissued, sometimes with new album art, mixes, and bonus material.

Hendrix's work as an accompanist appears on several different labels.  After he became popular, Hendrix contributed to recordings by several different artists.  In addition to the legitimate singles and albums released before his death, two albums worth of demos and outtakes recorded with Curtis Knight with misleading cover art and titles were released, which Hendrix publicly denounced.  After his death, many more such albums appeared.

Albums

Studio albums

Live albums

Compilation albums

Singles

Hendrix as an accompanist

Albums as sideman

Singles as sideman

See also
 Jimi Hendrix videography

Notes
Footnotes

Citations

References

Discography
Rock music discographies
Discographies of American artists